Pseudognaphalium biolettii, or two-color rabbit-tobacco, is an Asteraceae-family flowering plant found in western North America. An alternative common name is two-tone everlasting. This perennial species is a food plant for the larval/caterpillar stages of the American Lady butterfly. This plant thrives in coastal sage and scrub habitats of southern California and Baja California. Two-color rabbit tobacco may have a slight fragrance of lemon. Plant size is up to a meter high. The blooming period is typically January to June.

References 

biolettii